Langenlonsheim-Stromberg is a Verbandsgemeinde ("collective municipality") in the district of Bad Kreuznach, Rhineland-Palatinate, Germany. The seat of the Verbandsgemeinde is in Langenlonsheim. It was formed on 1 January 2020 by the merger of the former Verbandsgemeinden Langenlonsheim and Stromberg.

The Verbandsgemeinde Langenlonsheim-Stromberg consists of the following Ortsgemeinden ("local municipalities"):

 Bretzenheim
 Daxweiler
 Dörrebach
 Dorsheim
 Eckenroth
 Guldental
 Langenlonsheim
 Laubenheim
 Roth
 Rümmelsheim
 Schöneberg
 Schweppenhausen
 Seibersbach
 Stromberg
 Waldlaubersheim
 Warmsroth
 Windesheim

External links
Official website

Verbandsgemeinde in Rhineland-Palatinate